Slave to the System is an American alternative hard rock supergroup, consisting of Brother Cane and Queensrÿche band members, formed in 2000. The band independently released the album Slave to the System in 2002. Spitfire Records re-released the album in 2006.

History
In 2000, the band Queensrÿche went on a break after finishing a 6-month tour in support of Q2K. Drummer Scott Rockenfield and guitarist Kelly Gray, who played in Queensrÿche at that time, were discussing what to do. Gray had worked with Brother Cane on a project, and remained close to singer and guitarist Damon Johnson and bassist Roman Glick. He called Johnson in the summer of 2000, and suggested him to give Rockenfield a call. Rockenfield knew of the band, but never met them.

The name "Slave to the System" describes the effect of corporate minds on an artist's music, and hints at the band members' dissatisfaction with the record industry, as Rockenfield describes: "Every one of us was getting tired of being a 'slave' to the corporate system". The name was coined by Gray even before the band members first met.

Slave to the System has independently released their album Slave to the System in 2002. The band played one show in Tennessee and another Seattle after this release. In February 2004, Heard left for undisclosed reasons, and they continued as a four-piece.

In 2005, Slave to the System were signed to Spitfire Records, who had the album remixed and remastered, and released it on February 21, 2006. In 2006, Johnson said the band's second album was already completed, but to date, it has remained unreleased. "Stigmata" was released as a single, and peaked at 33 in both the Hot Mainstream Rock Tracks and Mainstream Rock categories. In support of the release, the band performed 19 shows in the American South and Midwest between February and April of that year. Due to prior commitments with other bands, other musicians filled in for Glick and Rockenfield on some of the shows.

In 2008, the band released two new songs via MySpace, titled "Freak" and "Who I Am Today". They have been on hiatus since.

Members

 Damon Johnson – lead vocals, guitar
 Kelly Gray – guitar, vocals
 Roman Glick – bass
 Scott Rockenfield – drums

Former members
 Scott Heard – guitar, vocals (2001–2004)

Touring
 Allen Park – bass (April 2006)
 Billy Wilkes – drums (April 18–27, 2006)

Discography
 Slave to the System (2002/2006)

References

American hard rock musical groups
Musical groups established in 2000
Rock music supergroups